The Hohe Warte Limestone is a geologic formation in Austria. It preserves fossils dating back to the Devonian period.

See also

 List of fossiliferous stratigraphic units in Austria

References
 

Geologic formations of Austria
Devonian System of Europe
Devonian Austria
Limestone formations